Desmod is a Slovak music band, playing mainly mainstream pop-rock songs, founded in 1996. The former lineup is completely different from the current one and they have played genres including soft rock and pop rock. Nowadays, Desmod is one of the most popular Slovak music groups.

Members
 Mário "Kuly" Kollár (vocals)
 Dušan Minka (bass guitar)
 Jano Škorec (drums)
 Rišo Synčák (guitar)
 Rišo Nagy (guitar)
 Michal Kožuch (manager)

Discography

Albums
 001 (2000)
 Mám chuť (2001)
 Derylov svet (2003)
 Skupinová terapia (2004)
 Uhol pohľadu (2006)
 Kyvadlo (2007)
 Vitajte na konci sveta (2010)
 Iný rozmer (2011)
 Javorový album (2012)
 Molekuly zvuku (2017)

See also
 The 100 Greatest Slovak Albums of All Time

External links 

 Official homepage (sk)

Slovak musical groups
Musical groups established in 1996
Nitra